The 2005–06 Deutsche Eishockey Liga season was the 12th season since the founding of the Deutsche Eishockey Liga. The German champion Eisbären Berlin defended its title in the final game on 17 April 2005. The Kassel Huskies left the league after losing in the playoff against the new DEL team the Füchse Duisburg.

Regular season

GP = Games Played
Color code:  = Direct Playoff qualification,  = Playoff qualification round,  = No playoff

Playoffs

References

DEL
DEL
Deutsche Eishockey Liga seasons